Paddy Richardson is a writer who lives in Dunedin, New Zealand.  She has published two collections of short stories, Choices (Hard Echo Press, 1986) and If We Were Lebanese (Steele Roberts, 2003), and three novels, The Company of a Daughter (Steele Roberts, 2000), A Year to Learn A Woman (Penguin, 2008) and Hunting Blind (Penguin, 2010). Her work has appeared in journals, anthologies, and on radio, and has been highly commended in several writing competitions, including the Katherine Mansfield and Sunday Star Times Short Story Awards. She has been awarded the University of Otago Burns Fellowship, the Beatson fellowship and the University of Otago/James Wallace residency.

Life 
Richardson lives and writes in Broad Bay, a beach settlement on the Otago Peninsula. She wrote part of her second novel A Year to Learn A Woman while living on the Kapiti Coast after being awarded the $6000 Foxton Fellowship, which included a month's residency in a cottage at Foxton Beach.

Books

Novels 
 The Company of A Daughter (Steele Roberts, 2000)
 A Year to Learn A Woman (Penguin Books, 2008)
 Hunting Blind (Penguin Books, 2010)
 Traces of Red (Penguin Books, 2011) 
 Swimming in the Dark (Upstart Press, 2014)

Short Story Collections 
 Choices (Hard Echo Press, 1986)
 If We Were Lebanese (Steel Roberts, 2003)

References

Living people
People from Otago Peninsula
Women crime fiction writers
New Zealand crime fiction writers
New Zealand women novelists
New Zealand women short story writers
20th-century New Zealand novelists
Year of birth missing (living people)
20th-century New Zealand short story writers
20th-century New Zealand women writers